Lotfy Labib (Arabic: لطفي لبيب, born 18 August 1938) is an Egyptian stage, television and film actor. He also worked as an announcer at one point. Despite having graduated from the Institute of Theatrical Arts in 1970, Labib's career was delayed for a whole decade. First, he was drafted in the army for six years, and then travelled outside Egypt for four years. His career truly started in 1981, when he acted in the play "The Bald Singer," which he followed with another stage production "The Hostages." Labib has since then worked profusely, in many supporting but memorable roles, with over 200 film and television credits. Though many of his screen appearances have been brief, Labib has performed admirably and has shown himself to be one of the strongest performers of his generation. He has appeared in 387 sequels (series, movies, radio and more.) since 1988.

Selected filmography

References

External links 

1947 births
Living people
Egyptian male film actors

Egyptian Christians